Dahlberg Borer Newcomer syndrome is a rare autosomal X-linked recessive genetic condition characterized by a prolapse of the bicuspid valve, progressive kidney failure, congenital lymphedema, hypoparathyroidism, and very short end bones of fingers.

Treatments 
Treatment for this condition is based on its symptoms. These treatments may include manual lymphatic drainage, consumption of beta blockers or anticoagulants for the bicuspid valve prolapse and vitamin D or calcium carbonate tablets for the hypoparathyroidism.

References

Further reading
 Dahlberg Borer Newcomer syndrome at Orphanet

External links 

Rare syndromes